The Duel is a French film directed by Pierre Fresnay, released in 1939. It is the only film directed by Pierre Fresnay.

Résumé 
A widow is loved by a doctor whose brother, a priest, unwittingly falls in love with the young woman, who is persuaded to enter the convent. Put on the right path by a missionary, the priest blesses the marriage of his brother.

Details 
1939 comedy: Length 84'- B&W
 Co-writer Jean Villard
 Director : Pierre Fresnay
 Writers : Henri-Georges Clouzot and Henri Lavedan
 Year : 1939
 After the novel by Henri Lavedan
 Director of photography Robert Juillard and Christian Matras
 Music by Maurice Yvain

Starring 
 Pierre Fresnay : Père Daniel Maurey
 Raimu : Père Bolène
 François Périer : François
 Anthony Carretier : Jaillon
 Yvonne Printemps : Thérèse Jaillon
 Raymond Rouleau : Dr. Pierre Maurey
 Paul Demange : le narrateur
 Nina Sinclair : la patiente
 Arlette Balkis
 Raymond Destac
 Marfa Dhervilly
 Gabrielle Fontan
 Simone Gauthier
 Georges Marceau
 Alexandre Mihalesco
 André Numès
 Manécanterie des Petits Chanteurs à la croix de bois

See also
The filmography of Petits Chanteurs à la Croix de Bois.

External links
 

1939 films
French black-and-white films
French comedy-drama films
1939 comedy-drama films
Films with screenplays by Henri-Georges Clouzot
1930s French films